Yayo Guridi (born November 6, 1965, in Villa María, Argentina) is an Argentine actor and comedian.

Biography 
José Carlos Guridi was born and raised in Villa María. He studied and graduated in economics at the National University of Córdoba and would be devoted to that profession for a short time. He was also an adviser to the Ministry of Economy.

After performing concerts and presentations for years in cafés and pubs, his rise to fame came in 1995 when he joined the comedy show Videomatch. In that program, he gave mainly performed sketches including high content of absurd, obscene, vulgar and off-color humor. Also conduct a fake Top Ten, entitled "Top Forry" where would perform parodies of music videos from artists like Nino Bravo, The Rolling Stones, Lionel Richie, Bee Gees, Bersuit Vergarabat, among others.

From 2008 to 2015 he appeared as part of the cast of Sin codificar, a TV show where the humour was somewhat less vulgar and more innocent. He is left-handed.

Filmography

Television

Movies

Awards

References

External links 
 
 

1965 births
Living people
Argentine male comedians
Argentine people of Basque descent
Argentine male film actors
Argentine male television actors
People from Villa María
National University of Córdoba alumni